Smilax calophylla  is a vine in the greenbrier family. It is native to parts of Southeast Asia (southern Thailand, Peninsular Malaysia, Singapore, Sumatra) as well as to northeastern Australia (Queensland).

Smilax calophylla is an erect to declining herb  up to 2.5 m tall, with yellow flowers and reddish-brown fruits. Tea brewed from the leaves is used as a male aphrodisiac in Malaysia.

References

External links
Total Vascular Flora of Singapore Online

Smilacaceae
Flora of Thailand
Flora of Malaya
Flora of Sumatra
Monocots of Australia
Flora of Queensland
Plants described in 1878